Dewey Cooper (born November 10, 1974) is an American former kickboxer and boxer who competed in the cruiserweight and heavyweight divisions. After becoming a two-time world champion in 2000 by taking the WKC heavyweight and WKF cruiserweight titles, he would go on to become a regular competitor in the K-1 promotion's US events. He came close to winning a K-1 Grand Prix Tournament when he defeated Nobu Hayashi and Samoan power puncher Mighty Mo, but lost out to Michael McDonald in the final of the K-1 World Grand Prix 2004 in Las Vegas I all in the same night.

Career
Born in Los Angeles, California, Cooper started practicing Muay Thai as a youngster and began training under Nick "One Kick" Blomgren at One Kick's Gym in Las Vegas, Nevada in 1994.

After making a name for himself on the American circuit by racking up a record of 15-2 (10 KOs), winning the USMTF and UKC national titles in the process, his services were recruited by K-1, the world's premier kickboxing organization. Debuting on January 22, 1999 at K-1 The Challenge '99 in Tokyo, Japan, Cooper was knocked out in the second round by Tsuyoshi Nakasako. Despite this setback, he went on to have a break-out year in 2000 when he won the WKC World Heavyweight Championship and WKF World Cruiserweight Championship. He also faced the legendary and recently un-retired Don "The Dragon" Wilson for the ISKA North American Cruiserweight (-88.2 kg/194.4 lb) Full Contact Championship at the MGM Grand Las Vegas on March 17, 2000, losing out via majority decision after ten rounds.

Returning to K-1 at the K-1 USA Championships 2000 on August 5, 2000, Cooper dropped a razor-thin split decision to Giuseppe De Natale after two extension rounds. 2001 fared better for Cooper, as he defeated Arne Soldwedel by unanimous decision at the K-1 World Grand Prix 2001 Preliminary USA in May and Mark Miller by technical knockout at the K-1 World Grand Prix 2001 in Las Vegas in August. These wins earned him a place among North America's eight best heavyweights in the K-1 World Grand Prix 2002 Preliminary USA tournament held on May 3, 2002 in Las Vegas. Cooper was drawn against Jean-Claude Leuyer at the quarter-final stage and floored the four-time world champion in the third round en route to a unanimous decision. In the semi-finals, he came up against one of the United States' most accomplished kickboxers in Rick Roufus. Roufus attacked Cooper's lead leg, which was already battered from the Leuyer fight, with low kicks from the first bell, taking away his mobility and offence. Roufus took the judges decision after three rounds.

Cooper was invited back to the Las Vegas Grand Prix the following year, going up against Japanese representative Yusuke Fujimoto in the opening round of the K-1 World Grand Prix 2003 in Las Vegas on May 2, 2003. He dropped Fujimoto with a left hook in the first round, but took a beating from his opponent's kicks in rounds two and three and lost via unanimous decision and was eliminated from the tournament. In his next outing in the promotion, Cooper went up against the reigning K-1 Las Vegas champion Carter Williams in a non-tournament match at the K-1 World Grand Prix 2003 in Las Vegas II on August 15, 2003. Cooper fought well, constantly moving while scoring on the larger Williams, who landed the harder shots. The crowd voiced its disapproval when Williams was announced as the winner on the judges' scorecards (30–27, 30–28, and 29.5–29).

Following a unanimous decision loss at the hands of Vitali Akhramenko at K-1 Final Fight Stars War in Zagreb on October 31, 2003, he competed in his third K-1 tournament, the K-1 World Grand Prix 2004 in Las Vegas I, on April 30, 2004. He was able to beat Seido karate stylist Nobu Hayashi by unanimous decision in the quarter-finals by staying the more active of the two. Then, in the semis, he became the first man to defeat Samoan knockout artist Mighty Mo. Despite giving up 37 kg/82 lb in weight to his opponent, Cooper used superior ring skills and took a unanimous decision (30–28.5, 29.5–29, and 29.5–29) after three rounds. He would then go up against Michael McDonald, a two-time K-1 USA tournament winner, in the final. McDonald outpointed Cooper on all three judges' scorecards (29–28, 30–28, and 30–27.5) to win his third North American Grand Prix.

Despite coming so close to claiming a K-1 tournament title, Cooper would not win another bout in the promotion. A split decision loss to Trinidadian brawler Gary Goodridge on August 7, 2004 at the K-1 World Grand Prix 2004 in Las Vegas II was followed up with two consecutive quarter-final defeats in the next two tournaments he entered; Kyokushin fighter Glaube Feitosa beat him at the April 30, 2005 K-1 World Grand Prix 2005 in Las Vegas and Scott Lighty outpointed him at the K-1 World Grand Prix 2006 in Las Vegas a year later. In what would be his last K-1 bout for six years, Cooper dropped a unanimous decision to Ruslan Karaev at the K-1 World Grand Prix 2006 in Las Vegas II on August 5, 2006.

2006 saw Cooper return to his career in professional boxing, in which he had notched up an undefeated record between 2001 and 2004. Despite tasting defeat in 2007 at the hands of Mike Alderete, who he would later defeat in a rematch, Cooper's boxing career culminated in a duo of fights with Arthur Williams for the  WBC United States Cruiserweight (-90.7 kg/200 lb) Championship. In his first fight with Williams, which took place in Lemoore, California on October 23, 2008, the match was stopped in the fifth of a scheduled ten rounds due to an accidental headbutt which caused a large gash on Williams’ forehead and Williams was named the winner on a technical decision. In their rematch on February 6, 2009 in the same city, Williams again walked away with the victory, a unanimous decision after the full ten rounds.

On July 17, 2009, Cooper competed at Kung Fu King 2009, an eight-man sanshou tournament in Guangzhou, China featuring such notables as Kaoklai Kaennorsing, Steve McKinnon and Muslim Salikhov. He was eliminated at the quarter-final stage after losing a decision to Yu Jin.

He made a return to K-1 in 2012 at thirty-seven years of age, headlining the card at the K-1 World Grand Prix 2012 in Los Angeles on September 8, 2012 against promotional newcomer Randy Blake with a place at the 2012 K-1 World Grand Prix at stake. Despite outweighing his opponent for the first time in his K-1 career, Cooper was unable to defeat the younger Blake and lost via unanimous decision after three rounds.

Cooper was initially set to fight Fred Sikking for the vacant WPMF World Heavyweight (-95.454 kg/210.4 lb) Championship at Muaythai Superfight in Pattaya, Thailand on May 13, 2013. The event was pushed back to June 14, 2013, however, and he lost by unanimous decision.

Cooper fought to a draw in a clinch-heavy affair with Peter Aerts at GFC Series 1 in Dubai, United Arab Emirates on May 29, 2014.

Also a trainer, Cooper's students include Daniel Strauss, Sanjar Rakhmanov, Roy Nelson, John Alessio, Kevin Lee, Jessica Rakoczy, Jessie Vargas, Beibut Shumenov, Francis Ngannou, Makhmud Muradov.

Championships and awards

Kickboxing
K-1
K-1 World Grand Prix 2004 in Las Vegas I Runner-up
K-1 World Grand Prix 2002 Preliminary USA Semifinalist
United States Muay Thai Federation
USMTF United States Championship
Universal Kickboxing Council
UKC United States Championship
World Kickboxing Council
WKC World Heavyweight Championship
World Kickboxing Federation
WKF World Cruiserweight Championship
Inducted in 2008 Martial Arts Hall of Fame
United States Muay Thai Association, Official Member 2016 Certified Arjarn (Master) Instructor Certificate Award.  Registered Member USMTA 01990010170592US

Boxing record

! colspan=10 style="background:white" | 19 wins (11 (T)KO's, 8 decisions), 3 losses (3 decisions), 3 draws
|-
|- bgcolor="#CCFFCC"
| 1 ||  Win  || 19–3–3 || align=left| Donnie Davis  || TKO  || 2  || 1:48  || 2012-03-31  || 4 Bears Casino & Lodge, New Town, North Dakota, US ||
|-
|- bgcolor="#CCFFCC"
| 2 ||  Win  || 18–3–3 || align=left| Cory Phelps  || UD  || 8  || 3:00  || 2009-07-03  || Plaza Hotel & Casino, Las Vegas, Nevada, US || 
|-
|- bgcolor="#FFBBBB"
| 3 ||  Loss  || 17–3–3 || align=left| Arthur Williams  || MD  || 10  || 3:00  || 2009-02-06  || Tachi Palace, Lemoore, California, US || 
|-
|- bgcolor="#FFBBBB"
| 4 ||  Loss  || 17–2–3 || align=left| Arthur Williams  || TD  || 5  || 3:00  || 2008-10-23  || Tachi Palace, Lemoore, California, US  || 
|-
|- bgcolor="#CCFFCC"
| 5 ||  Win  || 17–1–3 || align=left| Galen Brown  || UD  || 10  || 3:00  || 2008-08-21  || Tachi Palace, Lemoore, California, US ||
|-
|- style="background:#c5d2ea;"
| 6 ||  Draw  || 16–1–3 || align=left| Terrance Smith  || PTS  || 6  || 3:00  || 2008-06-26  || Tachi Palace, Lemoore, California, US ||
|-
|- bgcolor="#CCFFCC"
| 7 ||  Win  || 16–1–2 || align=left| Mike Alderete  || UD  || 8  || 3:00  || 2008-04-17  || Tachi Palace, Lemoore, California, US ||
|-
|- bgcolor="#FFBBBB"
| 8 ||  Loss  || 15–1–2 || align=left| Mike Alderete  || MD  || 6  || 3:00  || 2007-12-06  || Tachi Palace, Lemoore, California, US ||
|-
|- bgcolor="#CCFFCC"
| 9 ||  Win  || 15–0–2 || align=left| Salah Zabian  || TKO  || 4  || 2:13  || 2006-11-16  || Hard Rock Hotel and Casino, Las Vegas, Nevada, US ||
|-
|- bgcolor="#CCFFCC"
| 10 ||  Win  || 14–0–2 || align=left| Cullen Rogers  || UD  || 6  || 3:00  || 2006-03-31  || Edgewater Hotel and Casino, Laughlin, Nevada, US ||
|-
|- bgcolor="#CCFFCC"
| 11 ||  Win  || 13–0–2 || align=left| Jason Curry  || TKO  || 2  || 1:41  || 2004-11-26  || Plaza Hotel & Casino, Las Vegas, Nevada, US  ||
|-
|- bgcolor="#CCFFCC"
| 12 ||  Win  || 12–0–2 || align=left| Salah Zabian  || UD  || 6  || 3:00  || 2004-10-29  || The Orleans, Las Vegas, Nevada, US  ||
|-
|- bgcolor="#CCFFCC"
| 13 ||  Win  || 11–0–2 || align=left| Carl Gathright  || TKO  || 1  || 2:58  || 2004-10-01  || Gold Coast Hotel and Casino, Las Vegas, Nevada, US  ||
|-
|- bgcolor="#CCFFCC"
| 14 ||  Win  || 10–0–2 || align=left| Rodney Moore  || MD  || 6  || 3:00  || 2004-01-30  || The Orleans, Las Vegas, Nevada, US  ||
|-
|- bgcolor="#CCFFCC"
| 15 ||  Win  || 9–0–2 || align=left| Caesar Carbajal  || TKO  || 5  || 1:14  || 2003-10-17  || The Orleans, Las Vegas, Nevada, US  ||
|-
|- bgcolor="#CCFFCC"
| 16 ||  Win  || 8–0–2 || align=left| Jeff Bigger  || TKO  || 1  || 2:10  || 2003-08-01  || The Orleans, Las Vegas, Nevada, US  ||
|-
|- bgcolor="#CCFFCC"
| 17 ||  Win  || 7–0–2 || align=left| Robert Green  || MD  || 6  || 3:00  || 2003-02-28  || The Orleans, Las Vegas, Nevada, US  ||
|-
|- bgcolor="#CCFFCC"
| 18 ||  Win  || 6–0–2 || align=left| Jeff Lindsey  || KO  || 1  || 0:36  || 2002-12-27  || The Orleans, Las Vegas, Nevada, US  ||
|-
|- bgcolor="#CCFFCC"
| 19 ||  Win  || 5–0–2 || align=left| Raul Rene Fuentes  || TKO  || 2  || 1:13  || 2002-11-08  || Stratosphere Las Vegas, Las Vegas, Nevada, US  ||
|-
|- bgcolor="#CCFFCC"
| 20 ||  Win  || 4–0–2 || align=left| Raul Rene Fuentes  || TKO  || 4  || 1:58  || 2002-08-17  || The Aladdin, Las Vegas, Nevada, US  ||
|-
|- style="background:#c5d2ea;"
| 21 ||  Draw  || 3–0–2 || align=left| Robert Green  || PTS  || 4  || 3:00  || 2002-07-13  || The Aladdin, Las Vegas, Nevada, US  ||
|-
|- bgcolor="#CCFFCC"
| 22 ||  Win  || 3–0–1 || align=left| Isaac Broussard  || TKO  || 4  || 2:51  || 2002-06-14  || The Orleans, Las Vegas, Nevada, US  ||
|- 
|- style="background:#c5d2ea;"
| 23 ||  Draw  || 2–0–1 || align=left| Alex Conte  || PTS  || 4  || 3:00  || 2002-02-17  || Stardust Resort and Casino, Las Vegas, Nevada, US  ||
|-
|- bgcolor="#CCFFCC"
| 24 ||  Win  || 2–0 || align=left| Isaac Broussard  || MD  || 4  || 3:00  || 2002-01-13  || The Venetian Las Vegas, Las Vegas, Nevada, US  ||
|-
|- bgcolor="#CCFFCC"
| 25 ||  Win  || 1–0 || align=left| Doe Extee  || TKO  || 2  || 0:50  || 2001-10-19  || The Orleans, Las Vegas, Nevada, US  ||
|-
| colspan=10 | Legend:

Kickboxing record (Incomplete)

|-
|- style="background:#c5d2ea;"
| 2014-05-29 || Draw ||align=left| Peter Aerts || GFC Fight Series 1 || Dubai, UAE || Draw || 3 || 3:00
|-
|-  bgcolor="#FFBBBB"
| 2013-05-13 || Loss ||align=left| Fred Sikking || Muaythai Superfight || Pattaya, Thailand || Decision (unanimous) || 5 || 3:00
|-
! style=background:white colspan=9 |
|-
|-  bgcolor="#FFBBBB"
| 2012-09-08 || Loss ||align=left| Randy Blake || K-1 World Grand Prix 2012 in Los Angeles || Los Angeles, California, US || Decision (unanimous) || 3 || 3:00
|-
|-  bgcolor="#FFBBBB"
| 2011-11-27 || Loss ||align=left| Qiang Guo || WCK Muay Thai: USA vs. China || Las Vegas, Nevada, US || Decision (unanimous) || 5 || 3:00
|-
|-  bgcolor="#FFBBBB"
| 2009-07-17 || Loss ||align=left| Yu Jin || Kung Fu King 2009, Quarter Finals || Guangzhou, China || Decision || 5 || 3:00
|-
|-  bgcolor="#FFBBBB"
| 2006-08-12 || Loss ||align=left| Ruslan Karaev || K-1 World Grand Prix 2006 in Las Vegas II || Las Vegas, Nevada, US || Decision (unanimous) || 3 || 3:00
|-
|-  bgcolor="#FFBBBB"
| 2006-04-29 || Loss ||align=left| Scott Lighty || K-1 World Grand Prix 2006 in Las Vegas, Quarter Finals || Las Vegas, Nevada, US || Decision (unanimous) || 3 || 3:00
|-
|-  bgcolor="#FFBBBB"
| 2005-04-30 || Loss ||align=left| Glaube Feitosa || K-1 World Grand Prix 2005 in Las Vegas, Quarter Finals || Las Vegas, Nevada, US || Decision (unanimous) || 3 || 3:00
|-
|-  bgcolor="#FFBBBB"
| 2004-08-07 || Loss ||align=left| Gary Goodridge || K-1 World Grand Prix 2004 in Las Vegas II || Las Vegas, Nevada, US || Decision (split) || 3 || 3:00
|-
|-  bgcolor="#FFBBBB"
| 2004-04-30 || Loss ||align=left| Michael McDonald || K-1 World Grand Prix 2004 in Las Vegas I, Final || Las Vegas, Nevada, US || Decision (unanimous) || 3 || 3:00
|-
! style=background:white colspan=9 |
|-
|-  bgcolor="#CCFFCC"
| 2004-04-30 || Win ||align=left| Mighty Mo || K-1 World Grand Prix 2004 in Las Vegas I, Semi Finals || Las Vegas, Nevada, US || Decision (unanimous) || 3 || 3:00
|-
|-  bgcolor="#CCFFCC"
| 2004-04-30 || Win ||align=left| Nobu Hayashi || K-1 World Grand Prix 2004 in Las Vegas I, Quarter Finals || Las Vegas, Nevada, US || Decision (unanimous) || 3 || 3:00
|-
|-  bgcolor="#FFBBBB"
| 2003-10-31 || Loss ||align=left| Vitali Akhramenko || K-1 Final Fight Stars War in Zagreb || Zagreb, Croatia || Decision (unanimous) || 5 || 3:00
|-
|-  bgcolor="#FFBBBB"
| 2003-08-15 || Loss ||align=left| Carter Williams || K-1 World Grand Prix 2003 in Las Vegas II || Las Vegas, Nevada, US || Decision (unanimous) || 3 || 3:00
|-
|-  bgcolor="#FFBBBB"
| 2003-05-02 || Loss ||align=left| Yusuke Fujimoto || K-1 World Grand Prix 2003 in Las Vegas, Quarter Finals || Las Vegas, Nevada, US || Decision (unanimous) || 3 || 3:00
|-
|-  bgcolor="#FFBBBB"
| 2002-05-03 || Loss ||align=left| Rick Roufus || K-1 World Grand Prix 2002 Preliminary USA, Semi Finals || Las Vegas, Nevada, US || Decision (unanimous) || 3 || 3:00
|-
|-  bgcolor="#CCFFCC"
| 2002-05-03 || Win ||align=left| Jean-Claude Leuyer || K-1 World Grand Prix 2002 Preliminary USA, Quarter Finals || Las Vegas, Nevada, US || Decision (unanimous) || 3 || 3:00
|-
|-  bgcolor="#CCFFCC"
| 2001-08-11 || Win ||align=left| Mark Miller || K-1 World Grand Prix 2001 in Las Vegas || Las Vegas, Nevada, US || TKO || 2 || N/A
|-
|-  bgcolor="#CCFFCC"
| 2001-05-05 || Win ||align=left| Arne Soldwedel || K-1 World Grand Prix 2001 Preliminary USA || Las Vegas, Nevada, US || Decision (unanimous) || 3 || 3:00
|- 
|-  bgcolor="#FFBBBB"
| 2000-08-05 || Loss ||align=left| Giuseppe De Natale || K-1 USA Championships 2000 || Las Vegas, Nevada, US || Extra round decision (split) || 5 || 3:00
|-
|-  bgcolor="#CCFFCC"
| 2000-07-08 || Win ||align=left| Marcio Castillo || ISKA Kickboxing || Las Vegas, Nevada, US || TKO || 1 || 2:33
|-
|-  bgcolor="#FFBBBB"
| 2000-03-17 || Loss ||align=left| Don Wilson || N/A || Las Vegas, Nevada, US || Decision (majority) || 10 || 2:00
|-
! style=background:white colspan=9 |
|-
|-  bgcolor="#FFBBBB"
| 1999-10-23 || Loss ||align=left| Jeff Roufus || N/A || Milwaukee, Wisconsin, US || Decision || 5 || 3:00
|-
|-  bgcolor="#FFBBBB"
| 1999-03-22 || Loss ||align=left| Tsuyoshi Nakasako || K-1 The Challenge '99 || Tokyo, Japan || KO (right high kick) || 2 || 2:44
|-
|-
| colspan=9 | Legend:

Mixed martial arts record

|-
|-  bgcolor="#FFBBBB"
| 2007-10-18 || Loss ||align=left| Jimmy Dexter || PFC 4: Project Complete || United States || Decision (unanimous) || 3 || 3:00 || 2–1
|-
|-  bgcolor="#CCFFCC"
| 2007-09-29 || Win ||align=left| Adam Smith || Strikeforce: Playboy Mansion || Los Angeles, California, US || Decision (unanimous) || 3 || 3:00 || 2–0
|-
|-  bgcolor="#CCFFCC"
| 2007-07-19 || Win ||align=left| Adam Smith || PFC 3: Step Up || Lemoore, California, US || Decision (unanimous) || 3 || 3:00 || 1–0
|-
|-
| colspan=9 | Legend:

External links
 Official K-1 profile
 K-1Sport profile

References

Living people
1974 births
American male boxers
African-American boxers
Boxers from Nevada
Boxers from Los Angeles
Boxers trained by Kevin Barry
Cruiserweight boxers
Heavyweight boxers
American male kickboxers
kickboxers from California
Kickboxers from Nevada
Cruiserweight kickboxers
Heavyweight kickboxers
Kickboxing trainers
American male mixed martial artists
African-American mixed martial artists
Mixed martial artists from California
Mixed martial artists from Nevada
Light heavyweight mixed martial artists
Mixed martial artists utilizing boxing
Mixed martial artists utilizing Muay Thai
Mixed martial arts trainers
American Muay Thai practitioners
20th-century African-American sportspeople
21st-century African-American sportspeople
Sportspeople from Las Vegas